Jan Hoffmann may refer to:

 Jan Hoffmann (born 1955), German figure skater
 Jan Hoffmann (Danish footballer) (born 1971), Danish footballer
 Jan Hoffmann (German footballer) (born 1979), German footballer

See also
 Jan Hoffman
 Jann Hoffmann
 Jan Cornelis Hofman